Madiha Malihais a 2012 Pakistani telenovela broadcast by Hum TV. Premiering on 27 August 2012 the telenovela, which has been directed by Roomi Insha, has been written by Dilawar Khan and produced by Momina Duraid. It stars actors Junaid Khan, Zhalay Sarhadi and Urwa Tul Wusqua in the lead roles and its title song has been sung by Sara Raza Khan. Having story similar to Maat, the show was aired as a season 2 of Maat in India on Zee Zindagi.

Plot

Nafisa Akhtar is a middle class widow with limited means intending to marry her daughters Madiha and Maliha off at the earliest. While the elder Madiha is reticent, sensible and intelligent, Maliha is arrogant, rude and selfish. Eventually rich and handsome Shahriyaar comes to their lives, while Maliha crushes upon him, he chooses to marry Madiha, leaving Maliha devastated and bitter. Maliha marries her colleague and suitor for several years, Humayun.

Maliha, who is career oriented chooses to have an abortion to end her pregnancy, causing a divorce. Meanwhile, Shahriyaar who seeks warmth and companionship, feels suffocated in a passionless marriage with Madiha, who has preoccupied herself with the responsibilities of motherhood and household chores.

Madiha, seeing Maliha homeless after the demise of their mother decides to offer refuge to her at her own house, Maliha  taking advantage of this opportunity seduces Shahriyaar, who divorces Madiha to tie the knot with Maliha.

However, romance soon dies down in their marriage as Maliha's true colors begin to show. Ultimately, Shahriyaar chooses to get Maliha institutionalized and repursue Madiha, but Madiha, whom a career has given renewed confidence, proudly announces that she does not need a man to live now and would by no means return to Shahriyaar.

Cast 
 Junaid Khan as Shehryar
 Zhalay Sarhadi as Madiha
 Urwa Hocane as Maliha
 Badar Khalil
 Azra Aftab as Madiha's mother
 Mansha Pasha as Nisha
 Hasan Ahmed as Humayun
Zuhab Khan as Shehzad
Hiba Khan as Kiran

References

External links 
 
 

 

Zee Zindagi original programming
Hum TV original programming
2012 Pakistani television series debuts
Pakistani drama television series
2013 Pakistani television series endings
Urdu-language telenovelas
Pakistani telenovelas